The 1989 Yonex All England Open Championships was the 79th edition held in 1989, at Wembley Arena, London. In the men's singles defending champion Ib Frederiksen was eliminated in the first round.

Final results

Men's singles

Seeds

Section 1

Section 2

Women's singles

Seeds

Section 1

Section 2

References
 tournamentsoftware.com

All England Open Badminton Championships
All England Open
All England
All England Open Badminton Championships in London
All England Open Badminton Championships
All England Open Badminton Championships